Baw Baw may refer to:

Places in Australia:
 Baw Baw, New South Wales
 Baw Baw in Victoria:
 Baw Baw National Park
 Baw Baw Plateau in the Park
 Mount Baw Baw
 Shire of Baw Baw

See also
Baw Baw frog, a critically endangered frog, which lives on the Baw Baw Plateau.
Baw Baw berry, Wittsteinia vacciniacea, a plant species